Karca is a village in the Bolu District, Bolu Province, Turkey. Its population is 103 (2021).

References

Villages in Bolu District